Peter Krause is an American illustrator and comic book artist. He is best known for his work on various DC Comics titles, most notably the Superman-related titles and a three-year run on The Power of Shazam! with Captain Marvel and the Marvel Family.

Biography

Krause, a graduate of the University of Minnesota, is married with three children and currently works as a freelance illustrator. Krause's first published comics work appeared in a DC Comics Bonus Book in Suicide Squad #21 (December 1988). In 2009, Krause returned to comics to collaborate with writer Mark Waid on an independent series entitled Irredeemable for Boom! Studios.

Notes

References

External links
 

Living people
Year of birth missing (living people)
Place of birth missing (living people)
American illustrators
American comics artists
University of Minnesota alumni